Matthew Whitworth-Aylmer, 5th Baron Aylmer,  (24 May 1775 – 23 February 1850) was a British military officer and colonial administrator.

Napoleonic Wars
Aylmer was gazetted ensign in 1787, lieutenant in 1791 and major in 1800, after being held in a French prison for six months in 1798. His career continued as colonel in 1810, being aide-de-camp to King George III between 1810 and 1812 and then major general in 1813. He was present at most of the battles in the Peninsular War.

In 1814, following service in the French Revolutionary Wars and the Napoleonic Wars, he was appointed adjutant general of British forces in Ireland, where he remained until 1823.

North American administration
After reaching the position of lieutenant-general in 1825, Aylmer was, in 1830, appointed commander of British military forces in North America as well as Governor General of British North America and Lieutenant Governor of Lower Canada.

Lord Aylmer had no previous experience as a civil administrator and no political experience. He was unable to pacify the growing demands in Lower Canada for responsible government and, in 1834, the radical Assembly of Lower Canada passed 92 resolutions of grievance including a demand that Aylmer be recalled. Lord Aylmer exacerbated ethnic tensions in Lower Canada by favouring the English over the French. The deterioration of the situation led to his recall in 1835. His administration may have been a contributing factor to the Lower Canada Rebellion of 1837.

Return to England
Returning to England, Aylmer was promoted to the rank of general in 1845, but he never obtained a British peerage (his dignity was in the Irish peerage) or another administrative post.

He died at 15 Eaton Square, Belgravia, on 23 February 1850 and was buried at West Norwood Cemetery.

Aylmer's sister Rose Aylmer was the inspiration behind the poem of that name by Walter Savage Landor.

Family

General the Right Honourable Matthew Whitworth, 5th Lord Aylmer, G.C.B., married Louisa Anne Call, daughter of Sir John Call, Bart. on 4 August 1801. When her husband was appointed in 1830 to administer the government of Canada, as Governor-General, from February 1831 to August 1835, the couple entertained at the Castle of St. Louis, Quebec. During the cholera epidemic of 1831–32, she was interested in the relief of the sufferers. Since she was interested in education, she regularly visited and bestowed prizes in the schools. She served as the patroness of the Societe d'Education sous la direction des dames lie Quebec. She died on 13 August 1862.

References

 

Works cited
Obituary, The Times, 26 February 1850

External links 
 Archives of Matthew Whitworth-Aylmer, 5th Baron Aylmer (Matthew Whitworth=Aylmer, 5th Baron Aylmer and family fonds, R2517) are held at Library and Archives Canada

1775 births
1850 deaths
18th-century English nobility
19th-century English people
British Army personnel of the French Revolutionary Wars
British Army personnel of the Napoleonic Wars
Governors of British North America
Barons Aylmer
Knights Grand Cross of the Order of the Bath
British Army generals
Coldstream Guards officers
Burials at West Norwood Cemetery
English people of Irish descent
56th Regiment of Foot officers